Holly Block (December 24, 1958 – October 6, 2017) was an American museum and art gallery director.

Biography
Block was born on Christmas Eve 1958 in Princeton, New Jersey and was named for the celebration's traditional flora.  She grew up mostly in Washington D.C. and attended the Georgetown Day School.  She received a bachelor's degree in photography and sculpture from Bennington College in Bennington, Vermont, in 1980.  After college she returned to the District of Columbia and went to work for the Washington Project for the Arts, eventually becoming its project coordinator.

Block came to New York City in 1983, after working with Colab on the Ritz Hotel Project. From 1988 until 2004 she was the director of the alternative Tribeca art space Art in General.

She is perhaps best-remembered for her time as executive director of the Bronx Museum of the Arts.  Block was the executive director of the museum from 2006 until her death in 2017 and during that span instituted free admission and quadrupled the number of visitors to the institution.  In 2013 the Bronx Museum was chosen by the State department to do the American pavilion at the Venice Biennale which in turn chose an exhibition of work by Sarah Sze co-curated by Block and Carey Lovelace.

Her portrait is included in the series of Female museum art director by artist Amy Chaiklin.

References

1958 births
2017 deaths
People from New York City
Female archivists
Directors of museums in the United States
Women museum directors
American women curators
American curators
People from Princeton, New Jersey
People from Washington, D.C.
Bennington College alumni
Georgetown Day School alumni
21st-century American women